Lauricella is an Italian surname. Notable people with the surname include:

Giuseppe Lauricella (1867–1913), Italian mathematician
Hank Lauricella (1930–2014), American football player and member of both houses of the Louisiana State Legislature
Remo Lauricella (1912–2003), British composer and violinist
Salvatore Lauricella (1922–1996), Italian attorney, politician, and chairman of the Italian Socialist Party
Sergio Lauricella (1921–2008), Italian composer

See also
Lauricella's theorem

Italian-language surnames